Colpitts is a surname. Notable people with the surname include:

A. Russell Colpitts (born 1906), farmer and political figure in New Brunswick, Canada
Edwin H. Colpitts (1872–1949), communications pioneer best known for his invention of the Colpitts oscillator
Colpitts oscillator, design for an LC electronic oscillator circuit

See also
Colpitts Grange, village in Northumberland, England